Rabi resonance method is a technique developed by Isidor Isaac Rabi for measuring the nuclear spin. The atom is placed in a static magnetic field and a perpendicular rotating magnetic field.

We present a classical treatment in here.

Theory

When only the static magnetic field (B0) is turned on, the spin will precess around it with Larmor frequency ν0 and the corresponding angular frequency is ω0.

According to mechanics, the equation of motion of the spin J is:

 

 

where μ is the magnetic moment.

g is g-factor, which is dimensionless and reflecting the environmental effect on the spin.

Solving gives the angular frequency (Larmor frequency) with the magnetic field pointing on z-axis:

 

The minus sign is necessary. It reflects that the J is rotating in left-hand when the thumb is pointing as the H field.

when turned on the rotating magnetic field (BR), with angular frequency ω. In the rotating frame of the rotating field, the equation of motion is:

 

or

 

if , the static field is cancelled, and the spin now precesses around HR with angular frequency Rabi frequency

 

Since the rotating field is perpendicular to the static field, the spin in rotating frame is now able to flip between up and down.

By sweeping ωR, one can obtain a maximum flipping and determine the magnetic moment.

Experiment

The experiment setup contains 3 parts: an inhomogeneous magnetic field in front, the rotating field at the middle, and another inhomogeneous magnetic field at the end.

Atoms after passing the first inhomogeneous field will split into 2 beams corresponding the spin up and spin down state. Select one beam (spin up state, for example) and let it pass the rotating field. If the rotating field has frequency (ω) equal to the Larmor frequency, it will produce a high intensity of the other beam (spin down state). By sweeping the frequency to obtain a maximum intensity, one can find out the Larmor frequency and the magnetic moment of the atom.

References and notes
https://web.archive.org/web/20160325004825/https://www.colorado.edu/physics/phys7550/phys7550_sp07/extras/Ramsey90_RMP.pdf

See also
Rabi frequency
Rabi cycle
Rabi problem

Quantum optics
Atomic physics
Atomic, molecular, and optical physics